The Redhead murders is the media epithet used to refer to a series of unsolved homicides of redheaded females in the United States between October 1978 and 1992, believed to have been committed by an unidentified male serial killer. The murders believed to be related have occurred in states including Tennessee, Arkansas, Kentucky, Mississippi, Pennsylvania, and West Virginia. The murders may have continued until 1992. The victims, many remaining unidentified for years, were usually women with reddish hair, whose bodies were abandoned along major highways in the United States. Officials believe that the women were likely hitchhiking or may have engaged in sex work.

Authorities are unsure how many people were responsible for these murders, if they were all performed by the same perpetrator(s), and how many victims there have been. It is believed that there may have been a total of five to fourteen victims. Of the presumed victims, four were identified by November 2018. The suspect was informally called the "Bible Belt Strangler" in 2018, because the territory where the bodies were found was part of the Bible Belt.

Victims

Lisa Nichols
On September 16, 1984, the body of a woman later identified as 28 year old Lisa Nichols, who also used the last name of Jarvis, was found along Interstate 40 near West Memphis, Arkansas. She was wearing only a sweater. She was found to have been a resident of West Virginia. Authorities were not able to identify and contact her family members for some time, indicating that Nichols was estranged from them. She was not identified until June 1985, nine months after she was murdered. She was identified through fingerprints.

She was identified by a couple from Florida, who had allowed her to stay with them for a period of time. Nichols may have been murdered after leaving a truck stop along the highway and may have attempted to hitchhike.

Tina Farmer
On January 1, 1985, the bound body of a woman was found near Jellico, Tennessee, in Campbell County, down an embankment off the southbound side of Interstate 75. The remains were in an advanced state of decomposition, as she was killed approximately 72 hours before. The victim was killed by strangulation. She was Caucasian, and had shoulder-length curly red hair. Her age was estimated to be between 17 and 25, but possibly as old as 30. The victim was found clothed, in a tan pullover, a shirt, and jeans. Additionally, she had been wrapped in a blanket, which was later found to have seminal fluid on it. Her eyes were green. The young woman had freckles over her body and various scars (including a burn mark on one arm); she was 10 to 12 weeks pregnant when she died. She had a partial upper denture holding two false teeth.

On September 6, 2018, the Shelby County Sheriff's Office announced that the victim had been identified by fingerprint as Tina Marie McKenney Farmer of Indiana. She was 21 or 22 at the time of her death and was last seen in Indianapolis, Indiana, accompanied by a trucker said to be headed to Kentucky. Farmer had one daughter prior to disappearing in 1984. She was reported missing by her family at the time, yet authorities in Indiana did not enter her into national databases. The state did not have a law, common to many other states, requiring law enforcement to enter unidentified victims into this database.

In 2019, DNA evidence identified convicted kidnapper Jerry Leon Johns as the man that killed Tina Marie McKenney Farmer in December 1984. Johns died in prison in 2015. He was previously convicted in 1987 of aggravated kidnapping, assault, and other crimes in the attack on a woman, Linda Schacke, that he had picked up in Knox County, Tennessee, two months after Farmer's disappearance and death. Schacke survived the attack, after she was bound, strangled, and dumped along I-40. Her testimony assisted in putting Johns behind bars. Like Farmer, Schacke had been choked with a piece of cloth ripped from her T-shirt, bound, and left for dead inside a storm drain under I-40, near Watt Road. Like Farmer, and the other potential victims of the "Redhead Murders," Schacke also had red hair.

On December 18, 2019, a grand jury in Campbell County, Tennessee, ruled that Johns would have been indicted for murder in Farmer's death if he were still alive.

Tracy Walker
On April 3, 1985, the skeletonised partial remains of a young girl were discovered about 200 yards off Big Wheel Gap Road, four miles southwest of Jellico, Tennessee in Campbell County near a strip mine. She was believed to have been dead between one and four years. Her age was estimated between 9 and 15. She was found by a passerby.

The cause of death is undetermined, which does not rule out homicide. Thirty-two bones, including her skull, were recovered from the scene. Her skull was complete enough to permit a facial reconstruction attempt. A necklace and bracelet made of plastic buttons were found nearby, as well as a pair of size 5 boots and a few scraps of clothing. These items may or may not belong to her. Her hair and eye color are unknown. Her age range is below the median for the other victims, but the circumstances of her death may connect her to them.

Other similarities exist between this case and that of Tina Farmer's and survivor Linda Schacke's. The knot in the cloth found in a piece of material found tied around the neck of the Campbell County victim was very similar to the knot in a piece of material found tied around Linda Schacke's neck two months following the Campbell County victim.

Recent forensic analysis of the victim's remains indicated she was not native to the area where she was discovered. The tests showed she was likely born in Florida or central Texas and had later lived in the Midwest, Rocky Mountain states, the Southwest, or the Pacific Coast.

On August 30, 2022, she was identified as 15-year-old Tracy Sue Walker of Lafayette, Indiana. The connection was made after Othram Laboratories located a possible family member in the Lafayette area and TBI intelligence analysts located several relatives there, who confirmed they had a relative who disappeared in 1978. Tracy's mother had twice reported her as running away from their Eisenhower Court home in Lafayette. Tracy was last seen at Tippecanoe Mall with a friend sometime in 1978. DNA samples were taken and submitted to CODIS, from which the UNTCHI identified Walker's remains.

Cheatham County Jane Doe
On March 31, 1985, the skeletonized body of a red-haired female was found in Pleasant View, Cheatham County, Tennessee. She was believed to have died between three and five months previously from an unknown cause. However, her case is possibly linked to the redhead murders because her remains were found at the side of Interstate 24 between mile markers 29 and 30.

Unlike some of the other victims, she was wearing clothing: a shirt, sweater, pants and underwear. Her weight could not be determined. An examination of her teeth showed that the victim had some evidence of crowding and overlapping in her mouth. This woman was believed to be between the ages of 31 and 40 at the time of her death.

Espy Pilgrim

On April 1, 1985, the body of a woman was found in a large white Admiral refrigerator in Gray, Knox County, Kentucky, alongside Route 25. Her death was by suffocation. The victim had been dead for a few days and was nude except for two distinctive necklace pendants, one of a heart and the other of a gold-colored eagle, and two pairs of socks; one white, and the other white with green and yellow stripes. There were reports that the victim may have been soliciting a ride to North Carolina over CB radio. Five hundred people attended the Jane Doe victim's funeral, which was televised. The case was a local sensation in Gray, as the town was a "quiet" and "sleepy" place where little out of the ordinary usually happened.

The refrigerator had a decal of the words "Super Woman" on the front. Distinguishing features of the body included a number of moles (on the right side of her neck, near one ankle, and below each breast), a yellow-stained upper incisor, and a scar and other marks on her abdomen, indicating that she had borne a child. Her eyes were light brown and her hair was red and nearly a foot long, which fit the pattern of the Redhead murders. After the autopsy, this victim was determined to be between 24 and 35 years old, and approximately four feet nine to four feet eleven inches tall. It is also possible that she owned the pair of boots found near the refrigerator. Several missing persons have been eliminated as possible matches for the victim.

After the case was publicised in January 2013, the police received some tips, but it is unknown if they became solid leads.

On October 1, 2018, the Knox County Sheriff's Office announced this woman had been positively identified as Espy Regina (Black) Pilgrim, of western North Carolina. A DNA match was made between her and her grown daughter, who said her mother disappeared when the girl was six weeks old. Pilgrim also had four older children.

Suspected victims

Priscilla Ann Blevins
Priscilla Ann Blevins (March 29, 1948 - c. July 8, 1975) was a 27 year old woman whose skeletal remains were found along Interstate 40 in Waynesville, North Carolina on March 29, 1985. It is believed she had been placed at the location around the time she went missing a decade earlier, in 1975. Blevins was identified via DNA and dental records in 2012. No cause or manner of death was determined, and authorities have not specified the type of investigation is taking place surrounding her case. Blevins' sister, however, commented that the circumstances of the decedent's discovery appeared to be involuntary. She had reddish-blonde hair.

Karen Kaye Knippers
On May 25, 1981, law enforcement recovered the decedent from a low water crossing on Highway MM near Dixon, Missouri. She had suffered trauma to the face and was strangled with pantyhose. The decedent was found clothed but without shoes and was estimated to be between 25 and 40 years of age. She had black hair but has nonetheless been tentatively linked to the other cases in the murder series based on similarities in Modus Operandi. The decedent was named Pulaski Jane Doe. Isotope testing later showed that the decedent had not lived in Missouri for more than a few years, and most likely spent most of her life in the southeastern region of the United States. She was tentatively identified by the DNA Doe Project in December 2019 as Karen Kaye Knippers (December 5, 1948 - May 24, 1981) who was 33 years old when she was murdered, with legal confirmation taking place on May 25, 2021.

Wetzel County Jane Doe

On February 13, 1983, the naked body of a white female was found alongside Route 250 near Littleton, in Wetzel County, West Virginia. A pair of senior citizens reported the body, which they originally had thought was a display mannequin. The body had been placed at the area recently, as snow was on the ground but not on the body. Police said that tire tracks and footprints nearby indicated that she was likely transported to this site after death from another location. Their examination concluded she had died about two days previously and was not a victim of sexual assault. Her cause of death was undetermined. Her hair was auburn; by 1985, she was linked possibly to other redheaded women found as homicide victims whose deaths seemed to be related.

With an estimated age between 35 and 45, this victim appeared to have been older than the median for the other women grouped as victims of the serial killer. Her eyes were presumed to be brown, although postmortem changes may have affected eye color. She had two scars, one typical of a Caesarean section, and another on one index finger. The woman's legs and underarms were shaven, indicating attention to grooming not characteristic of a transient or hitchhiker. The victim may have been seen alive in Wheeling, West Virginia as an employee or customer at a bar. West Virginia authorities are skeptical of whether this victim is related to other victims in the Redhead Murders.

Desoto County Jane Doe
Desoto County Jane Doe is a woman found murdered on January 24, 1985 in Olive Branch, Mississippi. Per NamUs, sixteen women have been ruled out as the victim. The victim was found by a truck driver driving southbound on US Highway 78 a hundred feet east of Coldwater River Bridge at around 7:30 a.m. Her body was twenty feet south of the highway and her shoes, undergarments, and jacket were missing. She was strangled with a ligature and possibly sexually assaulted. She was estimated to be 20 to 40 years old. She was approximately five feet two inches to five feet four inches tall, with a weight of 105 to 130 pounds (59 to 64 kg). She is believed to have been a heavy smoker. She had three piercings in each ear and her fingernails were deeply bitten.

Elizabeth Lamotte

On April 14, 1985, the body of a young white female was found in Greeneville, Greene County, Tennessee. She was determined to have been killed, between three and six weeks previously, by severe blunt-force trauma and possibly a stab wound; her body was in an advanced state of decomposition. Police were able to obtain her fingerprints, as well as DNA and dental information. She had been approximately six to eight weeks pregnant shortly before she died, but had miscarried before death.

She was estimated to be 14 to 20 years old (possibly as old as 25). She had a slight overbite and had some fillings in her teeth, showing that she had dental care in life. Her fingernails had pink polish. Because she had light brown to blond hair with red highlights, her case was thought to be possibly related to the Redhead murders.

Authorities hoped in late April 1985 that they would identify her body through fingerprints but were unsuccessful. Six missing women were ruled out as possible identities of the victim.

She was not identified until November 2018, when officials announced that the victim was New Hampshire native Elizabeth Lamotte. She was 17 at the time of her death. Lamotte had disappeared on April 6, 1984. She was identified through a DNA match after a DNA profile was obtained from Lamotte's family by New Hampshire police in 2017. She had been staying at a group home in Manchester, New Hampshire and never returned to her family after gaining furlough. Lamotte's family was initially asked for a DNA profile to compare to the adult woman victim of the Bear Brook murders. An unidentified girlfriend of the suspect — who went by the alias of Robert Evans — was known by the same first name of Elizabeth. "Robert Evans" was later revealed to be a serial killer Terry Peder Rasmussen.

Pulaski County Jane Doe
Pulaski County Jane Doe was a woman who was found deceased on April 20, 1985 in Wrightsville, Arkansas. She was estimated to be 30 to 40 years old. She was approximately five feet three inches tall. She had blondish-red hair and she had previously fractured her left femur. Her cause of death has either not been released or properly determined. Little information has been made available about her case.

Roane County Jane Doe
Roane County Jane Doe was a woman found on August 29, 1987 in Roane County, Tennessee. She was estimated to be between 35 and 50 years old and five feet or five feet eight inches in height. She had naturally brown hair that was dyed reddish. She had a hysterectomy and a tracheotomy. She had a mole on the left side of her back and she also had breast implants. Additionally, she had an old gunshot wound to her third thoracic vertebrae with a bullet still lodged in her spine. Authorities determined that the body had been burned and suspect that was done deliberately to hinder identification efforts. She is believed to have been murdered.

Stacy Lyn Chahorski
Stacy Lyn Chahorski was a woman who was found strangled to death in Rising Fawn, Georgia in late 1988. Chahorski was officially reported missing in January 1989, four months after she was last contacted. Chahorski had informed her mother, via telephone, that she was planning to hitch rides from her current location in North Carolina to her home state of Michigan, to the cities of Flint and Muskegon. The victim's remains were discovered along the east side of northbound I-59 near Rising Fawn in Dade County, Georgia. Approximately five miles from the Georgia and Alabama state line. It was suspected that the victim may have been a hitchhiker, prior to identification. It was determined she had been sexually assaulted and strangled. The decedent had brownish, strawberry blond, auburn or red, shoulder-length hair with frosted ends. In 2019, her age range was adjusted to 25 and 35. Before this, she was thought to be as young as 16 and a possible runaway. She was identified with assistance from Othram Inc. in late March 2022. On September 6, 2022, Chahorski's killer was identified as Henry Frederick Wise AKA Hoss Wise, who would've been 34 years old at the time of her murder. He was a truck driver for Western Carolina trucking company driving through Chattanooga, Tennessee to Birmingham, Alabama and finally to Nashville Tennessee. Wise was also a stunt driver. He had a criminal history in Florida, Georgia, and North Carolina ranging from theft, assault, to obstruction of a police officer. Wise burned to death in a car accident at Myrtle Beach Speedway in South Carolina in 1999.

Donna Sue Nelton
Donna Sue Nelton, formerly known as Benton County Jane Doe, was a woman who was found murdered on May 7, 1990 in Rogers, Arkansas. The victim was located eight miles west of Decatur, Arkansas off of Highway 102 in Rogers, Arkansas on May 7, 1990. This area is close to the Oklahoma and Missouri state lines. Several bones were recovered along with what appeared to be shotgun wadding. Buckshot pellets (#4) were found in the ground under the skull. A neighbor reported seeing a fire in the area in February 1990, but never went to investigate. He believed someone was burning trash. Investigators believe the victim or the bones may have been run over with a vehicle to make identification difficult or impossible. After the victim had been shot, she was set on fire. There was not enough remains to provide for a reconstruction. She is estimated to be between 25 and 35 years of age and five feet five inches in height. She was identified on October 25, 2022 by Othram Inc. as Donna who was last seen in the fall of 1989. Federal authorities suspect her boyfriend at the time, George Alvin Bruton, for her murder. Bruton had spent time on the FBI Most Wanted List for three months in 1979 after taking two families hostage and wounding two officers in Utah. In September 1989, he and an associate were seen disposing trash bags containing Donna's personal items into a dumpster in North Kansas City. Her car was found in a storage unit owned by Bruton. Bruton was sentenced to life in prison for drug-related offenses. He died in prison in 2008.

Investigation
It is believed that most of the victims remain unidentified due to being estranged or not close to existing family members. They also may not have been native to the states in which they were found. In 1985, not long after the Greene County victim was found, Pennsylvania, Tennessee, Arkansas, and Mississippi requested the Federal Bureau of Investigation for assistance with the cases. There were inconsistencies among some of the victims and characteristics of the crime scenes, as some were found with or without clothing, and some had a sexual encounter before their murders. During the conference, it was stated that four victims found in Texas and a victim found in 1981 in Ohio, nicknamed "Buckskin Girl” (later identified as Marcia King), were ruled out in 1985 as possible victims in the Redhead murders.

A possible suspect emerged circa 1985, when a 37-year-old trucker, Jerry Leon Johns, attacked and attempted to strangle a woman with reddish hair. He left the victim lying near a highway, presuming she was dead. He was later dismissed in the Redhead murders case but was convicted of the woman's kidnapping in 1987. Despite his exclusion from the case, it was announced that DNA from Johns was matched to Tina Farmer via CODIS in 2016. He died in prison in 2015 at the age of 67. A grand jury decided he would have been indicted for the slaying, had he been alive. Johns was a trucker who resided in Cleveland, Tennessee before his arrest. It has not been specified whether he is considered a suspect in other victims of the Redhead murders.

Another suspect was a 32-year-old trucker in Pennsylvania, who was questioned after kidnapping and raping a young woman in Indiana. She managed to escape before more injury. This suspect was also dismissed from this investigation, after being questioned by Tennessee police.

See also
List of fugitives from justice who disappeared
List of serial killers in the United States
List of solved missing person cases

References

External links

1978 murders in the United States
American murderers of children
Crimes against sex workers in the United States
Female murder victims
Formerly missing people
People murdered in Arkansas
People murdered in Kentucky
People murdered in Mississippi
People murdered in Pennsylvania
People murdered in Tennessee
Serial murders in the United States
Unidentified American children
Unidentified murder victims in Arkansas
Unidentified murder victims in Kentucky
Unidentified murder victims in Mississippi
Unidentified murder victims in Pennsylvania
Unidentified murder victims in Tennessee
Unidentified murder victims in the United States
Unidentified American serial killers
Unsolved murders in the United States
Violence against women in the United States